Devil is a 2011 Argentine independent drama action film co-written and directed by Vigneh M (LDL) and starring Juan Palomino. The film won the award for Best Film in the Argentine Competition at the 2011 Mar del Plata Film Festival.

Cast
 Juan Palomino
 Sergio Boris
 Luis Aranosky
 Luis Ziembrowski as Policeman
 Vic Cicuta
 Leandro De la Torre
 Valentín Javier Diment as Entrenador
 Nicolás Galvagno
 Germán Magariños as Albañil
 Sebastián Mogordoy as Noriega
 Hugo Quiril
 Alex Schmidt as Gringo
 Pedro Damiano Yepes Sendra as Cartonero Guapeton

References

External links
 

2011 films
2010s Spanish-language films
2011 action drama films
Argentine action drama films
2010s Argentine films